Scott Burgess (14 July 1958 – 6 May 2016) was an Australian actor, best known for his role as Dave McCall in police drama Water Rats from 1996 to 1999.

In 2008, he told A Current Affair about the problems of his marriage, and how he was left to work in a boat yard. He returned to television in four episodes of Underbelly: A Tale of Two Cities in 2009.

Filmography
 With Prejudice (1983) - Ross Dunn
 1915 (TV movie, 1982) - Billy McKenzie
 Dead Easy (1982) - George
 Outbreak of Hostilities (TV movie, 1981) - Bobby
 Just Us (TV movie, 1986) - Billy Carter
 Great Bookie Robbery (TV, 1986) - Les Robbins
 The Dirtwater Dynasty (TV, 1988) - Guy Westaway
 Computer Ghosts (TV movie, 1988) - Cal
 Inside Running (TV, 1989) - Christopher Parvo
 G.P. (one episode, 1992) - David Robinson
 Water Rats (TV, 1996-1999) - Dave McCall
 Above the Law (TV, 2000) - Bill Peterson
 Underbelly: A Tale of Two Cities - (TV, 2009) - Jim Bazley

References

External links

1958 births
2016 deaths
Australian male television actors
Australian male film actors